Frank E. Resnik (October 14, 1928 – April 17, 1995) was CEO (1984–1989) and Chairman (1989–1991) of Philip Morris USA.

Resnik was born in Pleasant Unity, Pennsylvania.  After graduating from high school, he joined the United States Army where he became an instructor and first field sergeant. After his service in the Army, Resnik attended Saint Vincent College in Latrobe, Pennsylvania, on a football scholarship. In 1952, he graduated with a degree in chemistry, and began his career as a research chemist with Philip Morris, in Richmond, Virginia. He later received a master's degree in chemistry from the University of Richmond in Richmond, Virginia.

In 1980, Resnik was named executive vice president of Philip Morris' Tobacco Technology Group. In 1984, he was named president and CEO of Philip Morris USA. In 1989, he became chairman of that company.  In January 1991, after 38 years with Philip Morris, Resnik retired and moved to Jupiter, Florida.

During his career in the tobacco industry, Resnik contributed 30 articles to scientific literature.  In 1988, he received the Horatio Alger Award.

Resnik died April 17, 1995, in West Palm Beach, Florida.  He is buried in St. Vincent Cemetery, Unity Township, Westmoreland County, Pennsylvania.

References 

 Frank E. Resnik biography on the website of the Horatio Alger Association of Distinguished Americans
 "Frank E. Resnik -- Former Philip Morris Executive," Palm Beach Post, April 19, 1995
 "Frank E. Resnik -- Philip Morris Chairman," Washington Post, April 19, 1995
 Transcription of St. Vincent Cemetery

1928 births
1995 deaths
Saint Vincent College alumni
American chief executives
20th-century American chemists
People from Westmoreland County, Pennsylvania
Philip Morris USA
University of Richmond alumni